The 1983 Fresno State Bulldogs football team represented California State University, Fresno as a member of the Pacific Coast Athletic Association (PCAA) during the 1983 NCAA Division I-A football season. Led by sixth-year head coach Jim Sweeney, Fresno State finished the season with an overall record of 6–5 and a mark of 2–4 in conference play, placing sixth place in the PCAA. The Bulldogs played their home games at Bulldog Stadium in Fresno, California.

After the 1984 season, it was discovered that the UNLV Rebels had used multiple ineligible players during both the 1983 and 1984 seasons. As a result, UNLV's win in 1983 over Fresno State was forfeited, adjusting the Bulldogs' record to 7–4 overall and 3–3 in conference play, moving them into a tie for third place in the PCAA.

Schedule

Team players in the NFL
The following were selected in the 1984 NFL Draft.

The following finished their college career in 1983, were not drafted, but played in the NFL.

References

Fresno State
Fresno State Bulldogs football seasons
Fresno State Bulldogs football